Cola de Caballo (Spanish, 'Horse Tail') is a waterfall about 25 m (25 mi), in the town of Villa de Santiago, Nuevo León.  It is open to the public and is accessible via a walking path.

References 

 Entry at MonterreyVirtual (Spanish)

Nuevo Leon
Landforms of Nuevo León
Tourist attractions in Nuevo León
Fan waterfalls